The Tufts Jumbos football program represents Tufts University in the sport of American football. The team competes in Division III of the National Collegiate Athletic Association (NCAA) and the New England Small College Athletic Conference (NESCAC). The team's head coach is Jay Civetti, who has led the Jumbos since 2011.

The team has played since the 1874–75 season.  The Tufts football team played its first game on June 4, 1875 against Harvard, which Tufts won by a score of 1–0. This game is considered the first game of American football between two American colleges, with each team fielding 11 men, the ball being advanced by kicking or carrying it, and tackles of the ball carrier stopping play.

Tufts plays its home game at Ellis Oval, located on the campus in Medford, Massachusetts. One Tufts player, William Grinnell, has been inducted into the College Football Hall of Fame.

History

Seasons
Team records from 1875 to 2020.

Individual accomplishments

College Football Hall of Fame inductees
In 1951, the College Football Hall of Fame opened in South Bend, Indiana. Since then, Tufts has had 1 player inducted into the Hall of Fame.

Notes

References

External links

 

 
American football teams established in 1875
1875 establishments in Massachusetts